S. Rathinavelu  (Anna Dravida Munnetra Kazhagam) is an Indian politician elected as MLA from Musiri constituency, Thiruchirappalli district in 1984.
He was an advocate and senior politician. He is familiar person in Muthuraja community among Tamil Nadu.

References

External links
"Tough battle ahead for Vaiko in Virudhunagar". Deccan Herald. 11 April 2014.

All India Anna Dravida Munnetra Kazhagam politicians
Living people
People from Tiruchirappalli district
Year of birth missing (living people)
Tamil Nadu MLAs 1985–1989